Charles Rice may refer to:
 Charles Rice (fireman) (1840–1895), US Navy fireman and Medal of Honor recipient
 Charles Rice (general) (1787–1863), politician and officer in Massachusetts militia
 Charles Rice (sound engineer), sound engineer
 C. Allen Thorndike Rice (1851–1889), American author and publisher
 Charles E. Rice (1931–2015), American legal scholar
 Charles Francis Rice (1851–1927), American Methodist minister
 Charles M. Rice (born 1952), American virologist
 Charles Owen Rice (1908–2005), Roman Catholic priest and American labor activist
 Charles Spring Rice, 5th Baron Monteagle of Brandon (1887–1946), Anglo-Irish peer

See also
 Charles Rice Ames House, a residence in Belpre, Ohio, United States